Crambus sachaensis is a moth in the family Crambidae. It was described by Petr Ya. Ustjuzhanin in 1988. It is found in Yakutia, Russia.

References

Crambini
Moths described in 1988
Moths of Asia